The 1898 Paris–Amsterdam–Paris Race was a competitive 'city to city' motor race which ran over 7 days from 7–13 July 1898 and covered 1,431 km. It was won by Fernand Charron driving a Panhard et Levassor for 33 hours at an average speed of 43 km/h over unsurfaced roads.

The event was organised by the Automobile Club de France (ACF) and was sometimes retrospectively known as the III Grand Prix de l'A.C.F.

Results
Paris-Amsterdam-Paris Race - 7–13 July 1898 - 1,431 km
The Categorie Vitesse (Speed category) was sub-divided into classes 'A' - vehicles with 2-3 seats; 'B' - (vehicles with 4 seats and 'C' - General.

Overall 
The overall results for class A in the 'Categorie Vitesse' were:

Stage Winners
The stage winners were:

Did not finish
Entrants who did not finish :

See also
 Paris–Rouen (motor race)
 Paris–Bordeaux–Paris
 1896 Paris–Marseille–Paris

References

Auto races
Motorsport competitions in France
Motorsport competitions in Belgium
Motorsport competitions in the Netherlands
1898 in French motorsport
1898 in Dutch sport
Sports competitions in Paris
July 1898 sports events